Björn Rickard "Ricky" Bruch (2 July 1946 – 30 May 2011) was a Swedish discus thrower, poet and actor.

Career
Bruch was born in Örgryte, Gothenburg, grew up in Skåne, and was later a long-time resident of Malmö. His main discipline was the shot put, and later the discus, as he joined the ranks of the world's greatest in the early 1970s. The highlight of his career came in 1972, when he equalled the world record of 68.40 metres at the Dagens Nyheter games in Stockholm and, later that season, won a bronze medal at the 1972 Summer Olympics in Munich.

Throughout his career, Bruch was known as being both outspoken and controversial. He readily changed his opinions on various matters, and represented around a dozen athletics teams, including his own IK Diskus. Bruch was a solid athlete, but failed to achieve the greatest success possible in major international events. Arguably, Bruch's greatest successes were Olympic bronze in 1972 along with silver and bronze at the European Championships in Athletics. Bruch equaled the world record in 1972 with a throw of 68.40 metres. His personal best (71.26 metres in November 1984) puts him ninth in the all-time performers list. As well as achieving his sporting career and his turbulent personal life, Bruch also acted in light-entertainment films, debuting in the Italian action comedy film Anche gli angeli tirano di destro and appearing in a minor role in the film version of Ronia the Robber's Daughter.
After Bruch retired, he admitted to having used doping throughout his career. Despite this, he never tested positive during his career.

His autobiography Gladiatorns kamp (The Gladiator's Battle) was printed in 1990, and an anthology of his poetry, Själ och kropp: Dikter (Body and Soul: Poems), has also been published.

After a few years away from the glare of publicity in the early 1980s, he returned to the spotlight at the age of 38 in the autumn of 1984 – returning to form, he managed a number of throws over the 70 metre mark. He achieved his personal record of 71.26 metres in November 1984 at a competition in Malmö. This mark stood as the Swedish record for 33 years until Daniel Ståhl surpassed it in 2019. At the Swedish Championships in Västerås in 1985, Bruch was involved in a dispute with Anders Borgström, the team captain at the time. Bruch's willingness to speak his mind resulted, effectively, in his disqualification. However, he continued to appear in the media from time to time, most recently in a TV4 documentary from July 2005.

Bruch died on 30 May 2011 from pancreatic cancer.

Bibliography

Filmography
1974 – Charleston
1974 – Även änglar kan slå en rak höger
1978 – Dante – akta're för Hajen!
1978 – I Skyttens tegn
1984 – Ronia, the Robber's Daughter
1985 – Själen är större än världen
1993 – Drömkåken

References

External links 

  "Ricky Bruch – En svensk Muhammed Ali"
 IMDB – Stefan Jarl's documentary about Ricky Bruch

1946 births
2011 deaths
Doping cases in athletics
Swedish male discus throwers
Swedish sportspeople in doping cases
Athletes (track and field) at the 1968 Summer Olympics
Athletes (track and field) at the 1972 Summer Olympics
Athletes (track and field) at the 1976 Summer Olympics
Olympic athletes of Sweden
Olympic bronze medalists for Sweden
Athletes from Gothenburg
World record setters in athletics (track and field)
European Athletics Championships medalists
Medalists at the 1972 Summer Olympics
Olympic bronze medalists in athletics (track and field)